Kauko Antero Hänninen (28 January 1930 – 26 August 2013) was a Finnish rower who competed in the 1956 Summer Olympics, in the 1960 Summer Olympics, in the 1964 Summer Olympics, and in the 1968 Summer Olympics.

He was born in Kinnula.

In 1956 he was a crew member of the Finnish boat which won the bronze medal in the coxed fours event. He was also part of the Finnish boat which was eliminated in the repechage of the coxless four competition.

Four years later he was eliminated with the Finnish boat in the semi-finals of the coxed four event.

At the 1964 Games he was a member of the Finnish boat which was eliminated in the repechage of the coxless four competition.

His last Olympic appearance was in 1968 when he and his partner Pekka Sylvander were eliminated in the repechage of the coxless pair event.

Hänninen moved to Stockholm, Sweden, after his competitive career.

References

External links
 profile

1930 births
2013 deaths
People from Kinnula
Finnish male rowers
Olympic rowers of Finland
Rowers at the 1956 Summer Olympics
Rowers at the 1960 Summer Olympics
Rowers at the 1964 Summer Olympics
Rowers at the 1968 Summer Olympics
Olympic bronze medalists for Finland
Olympic medalists in rowing
Medalists at the 1956 Summer Olympics
Finnish expatriate sportspeople in Sweden
European Rowing Championships medalists
Sportspeople from Central Finland